{{DISPLAYTITLE:C6H4N2O2}}
The molecular formula C6H4N2O2 (molar mass: 136.11 g/mol) may refer to:

 Bimane or syn-Bimane
 anti-Bimane(Pubchem: 54280186)
 Dinitrosobenzene
 diiminobenzoquinone